Under the Radar is an American music magazine that features interviews with accompanying photo-shoots. Each issue includes opinion and commentary of the indie music scene as well as reviews of books, DVDs, and albums. The magazine posts web-exclusive interviews and reviews on its website.

Items are reviewed based on a rating system in which each album, book, and DVD receives a rating from 1 to 10. The magazine has been in publication since late 2001 and is issued three times per year.

The magazine was founded by co-publishers (and husband and wife) Mark Redfern and Wendy Lynch Redfern, who were married on June 2, 2007 and currently run the magazine. Mark is the magazine's Senior Editor and writes many of the magazine's articles. Wendy is the Creative Director and lays out each issue. She is also a music photographer and conducts photo-shoots for the magazine, including many of its covers.

Contents
It was the first American magazine to interview the following non-American bands: The Aliens, The Besnard Lakes, The Dears, The Duke Spirit, The Earlies, Editors, The Go! Team, Hope of the States, iLiKETRAiNS, I'm from Barcelona, The Long Blondes, Los Campesinos!, Love Is All, Lucky Soul, Mew, Mugison, Mystery Jets, The Pipettes, The Research, Serena Maneesh, The Sleepy Jackson, Taken By Trees,  The Thrills, and Young Galaxy. It was also the first print magazine to interview Vampire Weekend and Fleet Foxes.

Photographers who have shot for the magazine include: Crackerfarm, Wendy Lynch Redfern, Ray Lego, Koury Angelo, Ian Maddox, James Loveday, Autumn de Wilde, and David Redfern.

Issues
Under the Radar has had 67 print magazine issues since its debut in December 2001.

 Issue 1: Grandaddy (Dec. 2001)
 Issue 2: The Divine Comedy (Jul. 2002)
 Issue 3: The Flaming Lips (Oct. 2002)
 Issue 4: Elliott Smith (Mar. 2003)
 Issue 5: Black Rebel Motorcycle Club (Oct. 2003)
 Issue 6: Rilo Kiley (Jul. 2004)
 Issue 7: Interpol (Protest Issue) [Oct. 2004]
 Issue 8: Bright Eyes (Jan. 2005)
 Issue 9: Super Furry Animals (Mar. 2005)
 Issue 10: Death Cab for Cutie (Jul. 2005)
 Issue 11: O Canada! (Oct. 2005)
 Issue 12: Belle and Sebastian (Jan. 2006)
 Issue 13: The Raconteurs (Mar. 2006)
 Issue 14: The Dears (Jul. 2006)
 Issue 15: The Decemberists (Oct. 2006)
 Issue 16: Modest Mouse (Jan. 2007)
 Issue 17: Feist (Mar. 2007)
 Issue 18: Tegan and Sara (Jul. 2007)
 Issue 19: Beirut (Oct. 2007)
 Issue 20: She & Him (Jan. 2008)
 Issue 21: Flight of the Conchords (Mar. 2008)
 Issue 22: Colin Meloy, Chris Walla, and Britt Daniel (Protest Issue) [Jul. 2008]
 Issue 23: Jenny Lewis (Oct. 2008)
 Issue 24: Meric Long, Robin Pecknold, and Ezra Koenig (Dec. 2008)
 Issue 25: Grizzly Bear (Feb. 2009)
 Issue 26: Bat for Lashes (Apr. 2009)
 Issue 27: Jarvis Cocker (Jul. 2009)
 Issue 28: Monsters of Folk (Sep. 2009)
 Issue 29: Ben Gibbard, Kevin Barnes, Devendra Banhart, Jenny Lewis, and Bradford Cox (Dec. 2009)
 Issue 30: Vampire Weekend (Mar. 2010)
 Issue 31: Joanna Newsom (May 2010)
 Issue 32: Matt Berninger (Jul. 2010)
 Issue 33: Interpol (Oct. 2010)
 Issue 34: Sufjan Stevens (Dec. 2010)
 Issue 35: Death Cab for Cutie (Feb. 2011)
 Issue 36: Aziz Ansari (May 2011)
 Issue 37: St. Vincent (Jul. 2011)
 Issue 38: Robin Pecknold and Joanna Newsom (Oct. 2011)
 Issue 39: Faris Badwan, M83, and Bon Iver (Jan. 2012)
 Issue 40: Ed Droste, David Longstreth, and Twin Shadow (Mar. 2012)
 Issue 41: Yeasayer (May 2012)
 Issue 42: Tegan and Sara and Dan Deacon (Protest Issue) [Aug. 2012]
 Issue 43: Animal Collective (Nov. 2012)
 Issue 44: Grimes (Jan. 2013)
 Issue 45: Phoenix (Mar. 2013)
 Issue 46: Charli XCX (Jun. 2013)
 Issue 47: MGMT (Sep. 2013)
 Issue 48: HAIM (Nov. 2013)
 Issue 49: Fred Armisen and Carrie Brownstein (Feb. 2014)
 Issue 50: Future Islands (May 2014)
 Issue 51: alt-J (Sep. 2014)
 Issue 52: St. Vincent (Dec. 2014)
 Issue 53: Tame Impala (Apr. 2015)
 Issue 54: CHVRCHES (Aug. 2015)
 Issue 55: EL VY (Nov. 2015)
 Issue 56: Father John Misty and Wolf Alice (Jan. 2016)
 Issue 57: M83 (May 2016)
 Issue 58: Amanda Palmer (Protest Issue) [Sep. 2016]
 Issue 59: The Flaming Lips (Dec. 2016)
 Issue 60: Father John Misty (Apr. 2017)
 Issue 61: Grizzly Bear (Jul. 2017)
 Issue 62: Julien Baker (Oct. 2017)
 Issue 63: Courtney Barnett (Mar. 2018)
 Issue 64: Kamasi Washington (Aug. 2018)
 Issue 65: Mitski and boygenius (Mar. 2019)
 Issue 66: Angel Olsen and Sleater-Kinney (Sep. 2019)
 Issue 67: Phoebe Bridgers and Moses Sumney (Sep. 2020)
 Issue 68: Japanese Breakfast and HAIM (Protest Issue) [Apr. 2021]

Special issues and features

Issue 10, the Summer 2005 issue, featured the Britpop: A Decade On special section. The section featured new interviews with key members of mid-1990s Britpop bands.

For Issue 11, the Fall 2005 issue, Under the Radar ran a big 36-page special section on Canadian indie rock. The section included interviews with Canadian bands.

In Issue 17, the Spring 2007 issue, Under the Radar ran a 15-page special section entitled Music vs. Film. For the section, British band Kaiser Chiefs interviewed comedian/actor/writer Simon Pegg and Kevin Drew of the Canadian collective Broken Social Scene interviewed Irish actor Cillian Murphy. The section also included an interview with singer/actress Charlotte Gainsbourg. In addition, various bands wrote about their favorite movies.

For Issue 29, the Winter 2009 issue, included a Best of the Decade section, where a Top 200 Albums of the Decade list was featured.

Issue 36, the Spring 2011 issue, featured a special section entitled Music vs. Comedy, which featured interviews between music artists and comedians.

Issue 38, the Fall 2011 issue, celebrated the 10th anniversary of the magazine's debut. It featured an extensive interview between Robin Pecknold of Fleet Foxes and Joanna Newsom, along with new interviews with the artists that graced the cover of the first six editions. The magazine then celebrated its 15th anniversary with Issue 59, the Winter 2016 edition.

Issue 66, the Fall 2019 issue, featured a section entitled My Favorite Album, where many artists (including The Flaming Lips, Slowdive, Wilco, and many more) talk about their all-time favorite album.

Elliott Smith's last interview
In 2003, Mark Redfern and writer Marcus Kagler interviewed acclaimed singer/songwriter Elliott Smith for an Under the Radar cover story and Wendy Lynch photographed him for the cover. It was the first interview that Smith had done in a couple of years and at the time he was hard at work on his album From a Basement on the Hill. Elliott Smith killed himself later that year and the Under the Radar feature ended up being Smith's last interview and photo-shoot.

The Protest Issue
In 2004 and 2008, coinciding with the U.S. presidential elections, Under the Radar put together special "Protest Issue." In addition to politically themed articles, bands were photographed with self-made protest signs and the photos ran in the issue. The autographed protest signs were later auctioned off on eBay, with all the profits donated to the political action group Music for America. This trend continued for both the 2012 and 2016 U.S. presidential elections. The latest Protest Issue was released in 2021 and features Japanese Breakfast and HAIM on the covers.

U.S. political magazine The Nation named Under the Radar the Most Valuable Music Magazine in their 2016 Progressive Honor Roll.

Chris Walla Explains It All
From issue 7, 2004 through issue 22, 2008's editions of "The Protest issue", Death Cab for Cutie guitarist and indie rock producer Chris Walla has written a regular column for Under the Radar entitled "Chris Walla Explains It All".

Versus
From time to time, Under the Radar has a special feature where a current musician interviews for the magazine a musician whom they admire and who has influenced them. Versus features have included: Clinic vs. Can, Devendra Banhart vs. Donovan, The Dresden Dolls vs. Bauhaus, Love Is All vs. The Vaselines, Primal Scream vs. The Cramps, and The Thrills vs. Brian Wilson.

Website
Under the Radar has a website which features daily news items along with album reviews and artist interviews. A "Songs of the Week" list is posted to the website every week.

In popular culture
A fictitious cover of Under the Radar magazine makes an appearance in the 2019 Oscar-winning film Sound of Metal.

Awards
The magazine has been nominated as the Plug Awards "Magazine of the Year" three times.

References

Music magazines published in the United States
Magazines established in 2001
Magazines published in Los Angeles